Tarmo Antero "Lukkeri" Halonen (15 December 1938 – 26 October 2016) was an amateur lightweight boxer from Finland, who won a bronze medal at the 1963 European Championships. He competed at the 1964 Summer Olympics, but lost in the second round to the eventual winner Józef Grudzień. Halonen won the national lightweight title in three consecutive years, from 1962 to 1964. He was a grinder by profession, and after retiring from boxing worked as a coach.

References

1938 births
2016 deaths
Boxers at the 1964 Summer Olympics
Olympic boxers of Finland
Finnish male boxers
Lightweight boxers